Lloyd Roberts may refer to:

 Mooseman (Lloyd Roberts, 1962–2001), American bassist
 Loyd Roberts (1907–1989), college football and basketball player and coach
 Lloyd Roberts (politician) (1907–1961), Australian politician
 William Harris Lloyd Roberts (1884–1966), Canadian writer, poet, and playwright